Chone is a town in the province of Manabí in Ecuador. Officially,  La Real Santisíma Villa Rica de la Bendita Providencia de San Cayetano de Chone de esta nuestra Nueva Castilla in reference to Saint Cajetan and The City of Kings, called Pueblo Viejo de Chone or Señorío de Pechance was founded in the early days of the colonization. It is in Ecuador's low-lying coastal region and plays an important CHONE transportation hub. It is about seven hours by bus from the capital city of Quito.

According to the political-administrative division of the Republic of Ecuador is a territory with a legal category of Canton with the same name of its river, city and urban parish. Then there are: canton, city, town and parish Chone River. In the city are the main institutions and organizations of the council of Chone. All Canton is located along half of the province of Manabi, and political geographical axis is what is known as the northern area of Manabi. It is a prosperous area with its own identity and future competitiveness that includes the connection of production and trade hub across the northern Manabi is actually half of the province, besides being a top location enshrined in folklore coastal Ecuador mainly Montubio Ecuadorian Culture. Canton is the largest area at the provincial level and a major production center for raw materials that are absorbed quickly by the national and international industry, due to the excellent quality of their crops originated. Canton excel in this traditional crop planting and nourishing fruits of various coastal area, such as cocoa, coffee, banana, cassava, and maize.

History
Chone was founded on 7 August 1735 by a friar from Portoviejo, Jose Antonion Cedeño. Cedeno called the town, Villa de San Cayetano de Chone  Chone grew rapidly as a center for agriculture and transportation.

Geography
Due to the city's location, it is unfortunately prone to damaging floods during the coast's rainy season. During this time, the streets often become inundated with rain water, creating havoc on the mud streets. Many of the cities residents have taken to constructing homes on bamboo stilts to keep out the water.

The city lies on the banks of the important Rio Chone. Further west, the river becomes an estuary, opening to the coastal cities of Bahía de Caráquez and San Vicente.

The closest beaches are about two hours away in different directions. They include Crucita, San Vicente and San Clemente. The city of Manta has a popular beach and was home to an American military base in charge of helping battle the drug trade.

Culture

A popular fish is called chame (Chah-mee); known in English as the Pacific fat sleeper (Dormitator latifrons), it has many bones but is considered tasty. It is fried and served with rice, platano (plantain) and a small salad.

Notable people
 
 
Dario Cedeño (born 1991), Ecuadorian football player
Marlon Vera (born 1992), mixed martial artist

References

External links
 Canton of Chone
 Municipality of San Cayetano de Chone

Populated places in Manabí Province